The "Three Principles of the People" is the national anthem of the Republic of China as well as the party anthem of the Kuomintang. It was adopted in 1930 as China's national anthem and was used as such in Mainland China until 1949, when the Republic of China central government relocated to Taiwan following its defeat by the Chinese Communist Party in the Chinese Civil War. It replaced the "Song to the Auspicious Cloud", which had been used as the Chinese national anthem before. The national anthem was adopted in Taiwan on October 25, 1945 after the surrender of Imperial Japan. Mainland China, being governed by the People's Republic of China today, discontinued this national anthem for "March of the Volunteers".

The national anthem's words are adapted from a 1924 speech by Sun Yat-sen in 1937. The lyrics relate to how the vision and hopes of a new nation and its people can be achieved and maintained. Informally, the song is sometimes known as "San Min Chu-i" from its opening line, which references the Three Principles of the People (Sanmin Zhuyi), but this name is never used in formal or official occasions. During flag-raising ceremonies, the national anthem is played at the start prior to flag-raising followed by the National Flag Anthem of the Republic of China during actual flag-raising.

History 
The text was a collaboration between several Kuomintang (KMT) party members: Hu Hanmin, Tai Chi-tao, Liao Zhongkai, and Shao Yuanchong. The text debuted on 16 June 1924, as the opening of a speech by Sun Yat-sen at the opening ceremony of the Whampoa Military Academy. After the success of the Northern Expedition, the Kuomintang party chose the text to be its party anthem and publicly solicited for accompanying music. Cheng Maoyun won in a contest of 139 participants.

On 24 March 1930, numerous Kuomintang party members proposed to use the speech by Sun as the lyrics to the national anthem. At the time, the national anthem of the republic was the "Song to the Auspicious Cloud". Due to opposition over using a symbol of a political party to represent the entire nation, the National Anthem Editing and Research Committee was set up, which endorsed the KMT party song. On 3 June 1937, the Central Standing Committee approved the proposal, and in the 1940s, the song formally became the official national anthem of the Republic of China. For many Taiwanese, the anthem carries a number of meanings, often conflicting. Some Taiwanese reject the anthem outright as an anachronistic symbol of the vanquished KMT dictatorship.

Tune

Lyrics 

The lyrics are in classical literary Chinese. For example:
  is a literary equivalent of both singular and plural "you" (which are differentiated in modern Chinese) depending on the context. In this case, it is plural "you".
  is a classical synonym of "not" ( fēi).
  is a classical, archaic interjection, and is not used in this sense in the modern vernacular language.
In this respect, the national anthem of the Republic of China stands in contrast to the People's Republic of China's "March of the Volunteers", which was written a few years later entirely in modern vernacular Chinese.

As well as being written in classical Chinese, the national anthem follows classical poetic conventions.

English translations 
The official translation by Du Tingxiu (Theodore B. Tu) appears in English-language guides to the ROC published by the government.

Transcriptions in other Chinese and similar languages

Notes

References

Further reading 
 Reed W. L. and Bristow M. J. (eds.) (2002) "National Anthems of the World", 10 ed., London
 Cassell, p. 526.

External links 

 The National Anthem of the ROC (4 Versions)
 

National symbols of Taiwan
Political party songs
Three Principles of the People
China, Republic of
Chinese patriotic songs
National anthem compositions in C major
National symbols of the Republic of China (1912–1949)